Piotr Świst (born June 20, 1968 in Poland) is a Polish speedway rider who won Individual U-21 Polish Championship three times.

His surname "Świst" means 'whizz' in Polish.

Career 

 Individual World Championship
 1990 - injury in Continental Semi-Final B
 1991 - 10th place (8 points) in Continental Semi-Final B
 1992 - 15th place (2 points) in Semi-Final A
 1993 - 16th place (1 point) in Semi-Final B
 1994 - 15th place (1 point)
 Individual U-21 World Championship
 1987 - 2nd place (12 points +3)
 1988 - 8th place (9 points)
 1989 - 13th place (3 points)
 Team World Championship
 1995 - 1 point in Group A
 1995 - 9 points in Group B
 1996 - 8 points in Group B
 1999 - 5 points in Group B
 European Club Champions' Cup
 2000 - 2nd place (11 points)
 Individual Polish Championship
 1993 - 3rd place
 1995 - 2nd place
 2002 - 3rd place
 Individual U-21 Polish Championship
 1986 - 2nd place
 1987 - Polish Champion
 1988 - Polish Champion
 1989 - Polish Champion
 Polish Pairs Championship
 1987 - 2nd place
 1988 - 3rd place
 1989 - 3rd place
 1992 - Polish Champion
 1994 - 3rd place
 1997 - 3rd place
 2003 - 2nd place
 Polish Pairs U-21 Championship
 1986 - Polish Champion
 1987 - Polish Champion
 1988 - 2nd place
 1989 - 2nd place
 Team Polish Championship
 1984 - 2nd place
 1987 - 3rd place
 1992 - 2nd place
 1997 - 2nd place
 1998 - 3rd place
 Golden Helmet
  1988 - Winner
  1998 - 3rd place
 Silver Helmet (U-21)
 1986 - 3rd place
 1989 - Winner
 Bronze Helmet (U-19)
 1985 - 3rd place
 1986 - Winner
 1987 - Winner
 Individual Latvian Championship
 2008 Daugavpils - 2nd place

Notes

See also 
Poland national speedway team

1968 births
Living people
Polish speedway riders
Poole Pirates riders
Sportspeople from Gorzów Wielkopolski